Toporów  (German Topper) is a village in the administrative district of Gmina Łagów, within Świebodzin County, Lubusz Voivodeship, in western Poland. The village has a population of approximately 800. It is located on European Route E30.

References

Villages in Świebodzin County